Ali Mohammad Sagar is an Indian Politician and was a member of Jammu and Kashmir Legislative Assembly  elected in 2014 from Khanyar in Srinagar district as a candidate of Jammu & Kashmir National Conference. He was Minister of Rural Development in Omar Abdullah cabinet and was appointed as National Conference general secretary in 2014.

References

Living people
Jammu and Kashmir MLAs 2014–2018
People from Srinagar district
Year of birth missing (living people)
Jammu & Kashmir National Conference politicians
State cabinet ministers of Jammu and Kashmir